Diplommatina lourinae is a species of land snail, a gastropoda mollusk in the family Diplommatinidae.

References

Diplommatinidae
Gastropods described in 2015